Club Deportivo Universidad de Zaragoza was a Spanish football club based in Zaragoza, in the autonomous community of Aragon. Founded in 1993 as an independent club, it became Real Zaragoza's second reserve team between 2001 and 2010, and was dissolved in 2012.

Season to season
As CD Universidad-Porcell

As CD Universidad de Zaragoza

5 seasons in Tercera División

References

External links
Real Zaragoza official website 

1993 establishments in Aragon
2012 disestablishments in Aragon
Association football clubs established in 1993
Association football clubs disestablished in 2012
Defunct football clubs in Aragon
Real Zaragoza
Spanish reserve football teams
Sport in Zaragoza